{{Infobox concert
| concert_tour_name = Renaissance World Tour
| image             = Renaissance World Tour.jpg
| image_size        = 220
| alt               = 
| caption           = Promotional poster
| artist            = Beyoncé
| location          = 
| album             = Renaissance
| start_date        = 
| end_date          = 
| number_of_shows   = 57
| last_tour         = On the Run II Tour (2018)
| this_tour         = Renaissance World Tour (2023)
| next_tour         = ...
}}

The Renaissance World Tour is the upcoming eighth concert tour by American singer-songwriter Beyoncé. It was announced on February 1, 2023, in support of her seventh studio album, Renaissance (2022). The concert run is scheduled to begin on May 10, 2023, at Friends Arena in Stockholm. It will be the singer's second solo all-stadium tour, following The Formation World Tour in 2016.

Background
The tour was teased on October 23, 2022, when Beyoncé auctioned a ticket for an unspecified show. It was sold for $50,000 in a charity auction at the Wearable Art Gala to support the WACO Theatre. It included two tickets to the concert, first-class airfare, a three-night hotel stay, and a personal backstage tour led by Beyoncé's mother.

On February 1, 2023, Beyoncé announced the tour via her Instagram account.

 Ticketing 
Alongside the announcement of the tour, it was also announced that a public on-sale for the North American leg would initially not happen, with all initial ticket sales for the leg using Ticketmaster's Verified Fan system. In addition, all the cities in the North American leg of the tour would be split into three different registration groups that would all have different registration periods and on-sale times.

Jay Peters of The Verge noted that this spreading out of demand appeared to be an attempt by Ticketmaster to prevent an incident identical to the Ticketmaster-Taylor Swift fiasco that had occurred less than three months earlier, in which Ticketmaster crashed during the Verified Fan presale of the Eras Tour, the 2023 concert tour by American singer Taylor Swift. Peters questioned how effective the strategy would be since people could sign up for each of the registration groups instead of just one. Following the mismanagement of Swift's concert ticket sales had resulted in a U.S. Senate hearing, the Senate Judiciary Committee tweeted on their official Twitter account—"We're watching, @Ticketmaster" in regards to the Renaissance World Tour. 

In light of this, Ticketmaster has implemented new policies to try and combat difficulty for concertgoers and to “create a less crowded ticket shopping experience for fans.” Registration does not guarantee a ticket. Instead, a "lottery-style process" affects who is placed on the waitlist and who is given a unique access code after registering as a Verified Fan. Tickets bought in European markets also cannot be resold on Ticketmaster for more than their original price.

 Commercial performance 
ProjectionsRolling Stone described The Renaissance World Tour as "one of the most in-demand concerts in recent memory". Billboard'' projected it to gross approximately $300 million without additional shows, becoming Beyoncé's highest-grossing tour. According to Ticketmaster, the ticket demand exceeded the number of available tickets by more than 800% in Toronto, Chicago, East Rutherford, Summerfield, Atlanta, Inglewood and Houston, to all of which additional shows were added consequently. Live Nation said that, despite the newly added dates, the majority of fans will not be able to purchase tickets: "demand drastically exceeds supply".

Presale
The first pre-sale in the UK on February 2, which was exclusive for O2 customers, was met with "overwhelming" demand and caused the O2 Priority website to crash. Over 200,000 people were trying to purchase tickets for one of the London dates, of which fewer than 7,000 were available. After fans voiced their upset and caused "O2 Priority" to trend on Twitter, O2 released an apology acknowledging the "huge demand" and reassuring fans that they are working to resolve the issue.

A pre-sale on February 3, which was organized by Live Nation, saw over 3 million people trying to get tickets for dates in the UK, France, Sweden and Poland, which caused Ticketmaster to crash. In the first few minutes of the second UK pre-sale, over 400,000 people joined the queue to one of the London shows, which then extended to over 800,000 people. More than 600,000 people were in the queue for tickets to the Edinburgh show. Hotel room prices soared in Edinburgh for the date of the concert, with the price of one hotel room increasing by more than 360%. In France, over 260,000 people were trying to purchase tickets for the Paris show.

General sale 
Millions of people were trying to get tickets upon general sale in the UK, causing the Ticketmaster site to crash due to the "incredible" demand. After more than 370,000 people queued for each of the two London dates, a third date was added. The third London date saw half a million people queuing for tickets, leading to a fourth date being added. The fourth date saw another half a million people joining the queue, leading to a fifth date being added. More than 90% of hotels in the vicinity of Tottenham Hotspur Stadium are booked up for the dates of Beyoncé's shows, and the price of hotel rooms in Sunderland soared by almost 600% for the night of Beyoncé's concert.

Beyoncé's shows in Paris and Marseille sold out within minutes, with hundreds of thousands of fans trying to buy tickets and the Stade de France site crashing. Martin d'Argenlieu of Stade Vélodrome said that they had not seen such demand for a decade. Additional shows were added in Amsterdam, Stockholm, and Warsaw due to high demand for the first shows announced in those cities.

BeyGOOD 
As with previous tours, Beyoncé will support underserved communities in the cities she performs in, with the singer's BeyGOOD Foundation.

Tour tickets will be distributed to local community initiatives in cities across the US.

Shows

Notes

References

2023 concert tours
Beyoncé concert tours
Concert tours of Belgium
Concert tours of Canada
Concert tours of Europe
Concert tours of France
Concert tours of Germany
Concert tours of North America
Concert tours of Spain
Concert tours of Sweden
Concert tours of Switzerland
Concert tours of the Netherlands
Concert tours of the United Kingdom
Concert tours of the United States
Scheduled events